Guru Shisya is a 2001 Bengali drama film directed by Swapan Saha.

Plot

Cast
 Prosenjit Chatterjee as Kishore
 Rituparna Sengupta as Antora
 Soumitra Chatterjee as Shankar Maharaj
 Subhendu Chatterjee
 Subhasish Mukhopadhyay
 Koushik Bandyopadhyay
 Sanjib Dasgupta
 Bina Dasgupta
 Moumita Chakraborty

Soundtrack
All the soundtrack of Guru Shishya (2001) was composed by Babul Bose and lyrics were penned By Goutam Sushmit. It contains 8 songs.

References

External links
 

2000 films
2001 films
Bengali-language Indian films
Films directed by Swapan Saha
2000s Bengali-language films
Indian drama films
Films scored by Babul Bose